Fiona Margaret Greenham (born 19 May 1976) is a British former field hockey player who competed in the 2000 Summer Olympics. She was born in Portsmouth, England. She represented England and won a silver medal, at the 1998 Commonwealth Games in Kuala Lumpur.

References

External links
 

1976 births
Living people
Sportspeople from Portsmouth
British female field hockey players
Olympic field hockey players of Great Britain
Field hockey players at the 2000 Summer Olympics
Commonwealth Games medallists in field hockey
Commonwealth Games silver medallists for England
Loughborough Students field hockey players
Field hockey players at the 1998 Commonwealth Games
Medallists at the 1998 Commonwealth Games